Sarah Ann Cripps (1822 – 8 June 1892) was a New Zealand accommodation-house keeper, shopkeeper, postmistress and midwife. She was born Sarah Ann Rigelsford in London, England, in circa 1822. As a young woman, she set up her own dressmaking business, and married Isaac Cripps, a police officer, in 1844.

After participating in Charles Enderby's failed whaling settlement at Hardwicke on the Auckland Islands from 1849, Isaac and Sarah moved to the Wellington Region with their four young children and lived in Island Bay. In 1857 the Cripps bought 40 acres of land at Whareama on the route to the Hawke's Bay Region and established and ran an accommodation house there called "Sevenoaks". The homestead (pictured) was built in wattle and daub with toi-toi and raupo thatching.

Cripps became well known throughout the Wairarapa for running the guest house, as well as a small shop and the local mail service. She also home-schooled her ten children: Mary Ann, Caroline, Emily, Harriet, Margaret, Ellen and Sarah (twins), Isaac, Thomas and George.

Cripps later moved to Wellington, where she lived on Adelaide Road in Newtown. She died in Wellington on 8 June 1892 after a long illness and is buried at Karori Cemetery. After her death, she was called "the best loved woman from Wellington to Ahuriri", the latter being the Māori name for Napier. She was survived by her husband, who died in 1904 at their daughter's place in Upper Plain near Masterton.

Cripps is covered in volume 1 of Miriam Macgregor's book Petticoat Pioneers.

References

External links
Photograph of Sarah Cripps: http://www.teara.govt.nz/en/photograph/3520/sarah-ann-cripps

1822 births
1892 deaths
New Zealand midwives
English emigrants to New Zealand
New Zealand postmasters
New Zealand hoteliers
Merchants from London
Burials at Karori Cemetery
19th-century New Zealand people
19th-century English businesspeople